The governor of New Jersey is the head of government of New Jersey and the commander-in-chief of the state's military forces. The governor has a duty to enforce state laws and the power to either approve or veto bills passed by the New Jersey Legislature, to convene the legislature, and to grant pardons, except in cases of treason or impeachment.

The first New Jersey State Constitution, ratified in 1776, provided that a governor be elected annually by the state legislature, the members of which were selected by the several counties. Under this constitution, the governor was president of the upper house of the legislature, then called the Legislative Council. The 1844 constitution provided for a popular vote to elect the governor, who no longer presided over the upper house of the legislature, now called the Senate. The 1844 constitution also lengthened the governor's term to three years, set to start on the third Tuesday in January following an election, and barred governors from succeeding themselves. The 1947 constitution extended terms to four years, and limits governors from being elected to more than two consecutive terms, though they can run again after a third term has passed. Joseph Bloomfield, Peter Dumont Vroom, Daniel Haines, Joel Parker, Leon Abbett, and Walter Evans Edge each served two non-consecutive stints as governor while A. Harry Moore served three non-consecutive stints. Foster McGowan Voorhees, James Fairman Fielder, and Richard Codey each served two non-consecutive stints, one as acting governor and one as official governor.

The 1776 constitution provided that the vice-president of the Legislative Council would act as governor (who was president of the Council) should that office be vacant. The 1844 constitution placed the president of the Senate first in the line of succession, as did the subsequent 1947 constitution. A constitutional amendment in 2006 created the office of lieutenant governor, to be elected on the same ticket for the same term as the governor, and if the office of governor is vacant, the lieutenant governor becomes governor. This office was first filled in 2010.

There have been 55 official governors of New Jersey, 1 of whom was female, with several others acting as governor for a time. In the official numbering, governors are counted only once each, and traditionally, only elected governors were included. However, legislation signed on January 10, 2006, allowed acting governors who had served at least 180 days to be considered full governors. The law was retroactive to January 1, 2001; it therefore changed the titles of Donald DiFrancesco and Richard Codey, affecting Jim McGreevey's numbering. The current governor is Phil Murphy, who took office on January 16, 2018.

Governors

New Jersey was one of the original Thirteen Colonies and was admitted as a state on December 18, 1787. Prior to declaring its independence, New Jersey was a colony of the Kingdom of Great Britain.

Political party
 (27)
 (3)
 (5)
 (17)
 (4)

Succession

Prior to 2010, unlike most other states, New Jersey did not have the office of lieutenant governor. Until 2010, when the office of governor was vacant or the governor was unable to fulfill his/her duties through injury, the president of the State Senate served as the acting governor. The Senate president continued in the legislative role during his/her tenure as the state's acting chief executive, thus giving the person control over executive and legislative authority. The acting governor served either until a special election was held (which would occur if the governor died, resigned, or was removed from office with more than 16 months before the end of the term), until the governor recovered from his/her injuries, or, if the governor died, resigned, or was removed from office less than 16 months before end of the term, until the end of the term. 

Following the resignation of Christine Todd Whitman in 2001 to become EPA Administrator, Donald DiFrancesco assumed the acting governor's post. Following Whitman's resignation and DiFrancesco's departure, John O. Bennett served as acting governor for three and a half days. During that time, he signed a few bills into law, gave a State of the State Address, and held parties at Drumthwacket, the New Jersey governor's mansion. Similarly, Richard J. Codey served as acting governor as well. Because control of the New Jersey State Senate was split, resulting in two Senate co-presidents, Codey and Bennett, each held the office of acting governor for three days. For a second time, Richard Codey served as acting governor of New Jersey until January 2006, following the resignation of Jim McGreevey in late 2004.

See also
 List of New Jersey state legislatures

Notes

References
General

Biographies of New Jersey Governors, New Jersey State Library

Constitutions

Specific

External links

Office of the Governor of New Jersey

Lists of state governors of the United States
Governors